Heist-op-den-Berg is a railway station in the town of Heist-op-den-Berg, Antwerp, Belgium. The station opened on 10 June 1864 and is located on line 16. The train services are operated by National Railway Company of Belgium (NMBS).

Train services
The station is served by the following services:

Intercity services (IC-09) Antwerp - Lier - Aarschot - Leuven (weekdays)
Intercity services (IC-09) Antwerp - Lier - Aarschot - Hasselt - Liege (weekends)
Local services (L-23) Antwerp - Lier - Aarschot - Leuven

References

Railway stations in Belgium
Railway stations opened in 1864
Railway stations in Antwerp Province
Heist-op-den-Berg